{{Infobox martial artist
| name            = Ed West
| other_names     = Wild
| image           = 
| image_size      = 150px 
| alt             =
| caption         =
| birth_name      = 
| birth_date      = 
| birth_place     = Olongapo, Philippines
| death_date      =
| death_place     =
| death_cause     =
| residence       = 
| nationality     = American
| height          = 
| weight          = 
| weight_class    = Bantamweight
| reach_in        = 68
| reach_footnote  = 
| style           = 
| stance          = Orthodox
| fighting_out_of = Tucson, Arizona, United States
| team            = Apex MMA
| trainer         = Rocco DePalo
| rank            =  3rd Degree Black Belt in Taekwondo  Black Belt in Karate Black Belt in Judo Black Belt in Aikido Black Belt in Jujutsu
| years_active    = 2003–present| mma_kowin       = 1
| mma_subwin      = 14
| mma_decwin      = 10
| mma_koloss      = 3
| mma_subloss     = 1
| mma_decloss     = 6
| mma_draw        =
| mma_nc          =
| amwins          = 
| amkowins        =
| amsubwins       = 
| amlosses        = 
| amkolosses      = 
| amsublosses     = 
| amdraws         = 
| amncs           =
| occupation      = 
| university      =
| spouse          =
| relatives       =
| students        = 
| club            = 
| school          = 
| url             =
| sherdog         = 7166
| footnotes       =
| updated         =
}}

Ed West (born October 30, 1983) is a Filipino-born American mixed martial artist. He competed in the Bantamweight division of Bellator MMA, and the World Series of Fighting (WSOF).

Early life
West was born in Olongapo, Philippines where both his mother and father served in the US Navy. He attended kindergarten, first grade and his first Tae Kwon Do classes there and then moved to the States with his parents when he was 7 years old.

A few years after arriving in America, Ed became re-involved in martial arts when he was 9 years old. He was inspired by watching Jean-Claude Van Damme movies and practiced styles like Karate, Taekwondo, Judo, Aikido, Jujutsu, and Kung Fu. At 16, Ed met a man who told him he was a cage fighter, which led West to travel down the road of Mixed Martial Arts. West's first cage fight was in March 2003 fighting in the Rage in the Cage organization.

West also attended Pima Community College in Tucson, Arizona where he studied nutrition and sports medicine.

Mixed martial arts career
West currently trains at Apex MMA in Tucson, Arizona. Since 2003, West has fought in many MMA organizations in the United States, where he finished 9 of his 17 victories with a submission (particularly armbars) as a professional fighter. He made his debut in the Rage in the Cage'' tournaments and piled up a successful winning record.

International Fight League

In 2006–2007, West competed in the team-based International Fight League as a member of Ken Yasuda's Tokyo Sabres. Despite his three losses in the IFL, West proved himself by moving up two weight classes and fighting against bigger fighters in the lightweight division. Although West's first IFL match was a loss to his opponent, Chris Horodecki, after having to be decided by the judges, the pair put on a tough battle that was awarded "Fight of the Night" honors.

Desert Rage Full Contact Fighting

In 2010, West won Arizona's Desert Rage Full Contact Fighting bantamweight championship when he defeated Tyler Bialecki. West then defended his belt against Sam Rodriguez the following year.

Bellator Fighting Championships
West quickly became a fan favorite when he entered the Bellator Fighting Championships bantamweight tournament in 2010. At Bellator 32, West fought Zach Makovsky in the finals for the chance to become the Bellator bantamweight champion. Despite a noble effort, fighting a war for five rounds, Makovsky received the unanimous decision.

West took on Luis Nogueira at Bellator 51 in the opening round of the season 5 tournament. He won by unanimous decision. West would then take Eduardo Dantas in the semi-finals at Bellator 55. He lost by Split Decision.

West took on Marcos Galvão at Bellator 65 in the season six quarter-finals match up. He lost via unanimous decision.

At Bellator 91 West would take on Josh Montoya. He won via Knockout, which happens to be his first win by knockout.

After his win over Montoya, West was granted his release from Bellator MMA and became a free agent.

Independent promotions
After parting ways with Bellator, West returned almost a year later and faced Antonio Duarte at MF - Mexico Fighter 5 on February 15, 2014. West lost the bout via anaconda choke submission in the first round, the first submission loss of his career.

Return to Bellator
On May 29, 2014, it was announced that West re-signed with Bellator.

West faced Mike Richman on September 26, 2014 at Bellator 126. He lost the fight via knockout in the first round.

World Series of Fighting
West signed with World Series of Fighting and faced Russian fighter Timur Valiev in his debut on March 28, 2015. He lost the fight via TKO in the first round.

Championships and accomplishments

Mixed martial arts
International Fight League
Fight of the Night (One time) vs. Chris Horodecki 
Desert Rage Full Contact Fighting
DRFCF Bantamweight Championship (One time; Current)
Rage in the Cage
RITC Lightweight Championship (One time)

Mixed martial arts record

|-
| Win
| align=center| 25–10
| Matt Betzold
| Decision (unanimous)
| WFF 40
| 
| align=center|5
| align=center|5:00
| Chandler, Arizona, United States
| 
|-
| Win
| align=center| 24–10
| Daniel Soto
| Submission (armbar)
| RUF MMA 27
| 
| align=center|1
| align=center|1:36
| Tucson, Arizona, United States
| 
|-
| Win
| align=center| 23–10
| Gilberto Aguilar
| Submission (verbal)
| Aggression Session MMA: Anarchy
| 
| align=center|1
| align=center|3:22
| Prescott Valley, Arizona, United States
| 
|-
| Win
| align=center| 22–10
| Glen Baker
| Submission (rear-naked choke)
| WFF 34
| 
| align=center|1
| align=center|1:55
| Chandler, Arizona, United States
|
|-
| Win
| align=center| 21–10
| Chris Hernandez
| Submission (triangle choke)
| Cage Rage at the Diamond 2
| 
| align=center|1
| align=center|0:29
| Sahuarita, Arizona, United States
|
|-
| Win
| align=center| 20–10
| Roman Salazar
| Decision (unanimous)
| Aggression Session 3
| 
| align=center|3
| align=center|5:00
| Scottsdale, Arizona, United States
|
|-
| Win
| align=center| 19–10
| Jose Carbajal
| Submission (rear-naked choke)
| RITC: Rage in the Cage 179
| 
| align=center|1
| align=center|3:05
| Yuma, Arizona, United States
|
|-
| Loss
| align=center| 18–10
| Timur Valiev
| TKO (punches)
| WSOF 19: Gaethje vs. Palomino
| 
| align=center|1
| align=center|1:39
| Phoenix, Arizona, United States 
|
|-
| Loss
| align=center| 18–9
| Mike Richman
| KO (punches)
| Bellator 126
| 
| align=center|1
| align=center|2:44
| Phoenix, Arizona, United States 
|
|-
| Loss
| align=center| 18–8
| Antonio Duarte
| Submission (anaconda choke)
| MF - Mexico Fighter 5
| 
| align=center|1
| align=center|4:42
| Hermosillo, Sonora, Mexico
|
|-
| Win
| align=center| 18–7
| Josh Montoya
| KO (head kick)
| Bellator 91
| 
| align=center|2
| align=center|2:51
| Rio Rancho, New Mexico, United States
|
|-
| Loss
| align=center| 17–7
| Marcos Galvão
| Decision (unanimous)
| Bellator 65
| 
| align=center|3
| align=center|5:00
| Atlantic City, New Jersey, United States
| 
|-
| Loss
| align=center| 17–6
| Eduardo Dantas
| Decision (split)
| Bellator 55 
| 
| align=center|3
| align=center|5:00
| Yuma, Arizona, United States
| 
|-
| Win
| align=center|17–5
| Luis Nogueira
| Decision (unanimous)
| Bellator 51 
| 
| align=center|3
| align=center|5:00
| Canton, Ohio, United States
| 
|-
| Win
| align=center| 16–5
| Sam Rodriguez
| Submission (armbar)
| Desert Rage Full Contact Fighting 9 
| 
| align=center|1
| align=center|1:22
| Yuma, Arizona, United States
| 
|-
| Loss
| align=center| 15–5
| Zach Makovsky
| Decision (unanimous) 
| Bellator 32
| 
| align=center|5
| align=center|5:00
| Kansas City, Missouri, United States
| 
|-
| Win
| align=center| 15–4
| Jose Vega
| Decision (split)
| Bellator 30
| 
| align=center|3
| align=center|5:00
| Louisville, Kentucky, United States
| 
|-
| Win
| align=center| 14–4
| Bryan Goldsby
| Decision (unanimous)
| Bellator 27
| 
| align=center|3
| align=center|5:00
| San Antonio, Texas, United States
| 
|-
| Win
| align=center| 13–4
| Tyler Bialecki
| Submission (triangle choke)
| Desert Rage Full Contact Fighting 7
| 
| align=center|1
| align=center|1:25
| Yuma, Arizona, United States
| 
|-
| Win
| align=center| 12–4
| Jose Carbajal
| Submission (guillotine choke)
| Desert Rage Full Contact Fighting 6
| 
| align=center|1
| align=center|1:38
| Yuma, Arizona, United States
| 
|-
| Win
| align=center| 11–4
| Del Hawkins
| Decision (unanimous)
| Apocalypse Fights 1
| 
| align=center|3
| align=center|N/A
| United States
|
|-
| Win
| align=center| 10–4
| Austin Pascucci
| Submission (armbar)
| Rage in the Cage 109
| 
| align=center|2
| align=center|0:28
| Tucson, Arizona, United States
|
|-
| Win
| align=center| 9–4
| Nick Hedrick
| Submission (rear-naked choke)
| CS - Cage Supremacy 2
| 
| align=center|1
| align=center|2:26
| Tucson, Arizona, United States
|
|-
| Loss
| align=center| 8–4
| Savant Young
| Decision (unanimous)
| IFL: Houston
| 
| align=center|3
| align=center|4:00
| Houston, Texas, United States
|
|-
| Loss
| align=center| 8–3
| Erik Owings
| Decision (unanimous)
| IFL: Championship Final
| 
| align=center|3
| align=center|4:00
| Uncasville, Connecticut, United States
|
|-
| Loss
| align=center| 8–2
| Chris Horodecki
| Decision (unanimous)
| International Fight League: Portland 
| 
| align=center|3
| align=center|4:00
| Portland, Oregon, United States
| 
|-
| Win
| align=center| 8–1
| Carlos Ortega
| Decision (unanimous)
| RITC 79: The Rage Returns
| 
| align=center|3
| align=center|3:00
| Tucson, Arizona, United States
| 
|-
| Win
| align=center| 7–1
| Reynaldo Walter Duarte
| Decision (split)
| RITC 76: Hello Tucson
| 
| align=center|3
| align=center|3:00
| Tucson, Arizona, United States
|
|-
| Win
| align=center| 6–1
| Chris David
| Decision (unanimous)
| RITC 64: Heart & Soul
| 
| align=center|3
| align=center|3:00
| Phoenix, Arizona, United States
| 
|-
| Win
| align=center| 5–1
| Amos Sotelo
| Submission (kimura)
| RITC 61: Relentless  
| 
| align=center|1
| align=center|1:01
| Phoenix, Arizona, United States
|
|-
| Loss
| align=center| 4–1
| Harris Sarmiento
| TKO (punches)
| SuperBrawl 34
| 
| align=center|1
| align=center|2:08
| Wailuku, Hawaii, United States
|
|-
| Win
| align=center| 4–0
| Carlos Ortega
| Decision (unanimous)
| RITC 59: Let the Punishment Begin
| 
| align=center|3
| align=center|3:00
| Casa Grande, Arizona, United States
|
|-
| Win
| align=center| 3–0
| Troy Tolbert
| Submission (armbar)
| RITC 57: Tucson Revisited
| 
| align=center|1
| align=center|0:34
| Tucson, Arizona, United States
|
|-
| Win
| align=center| 2–0
| Joe Vigil
| Submission (armbar)
| RITC 47: Unstoppable
| 
| align=center|1
| align=center|1:57
| Phoenix, Arizona, United States
|
|-
| Win
| align=center| 1–0
| Troy Tolbert
| Submission (armbar)
| RITC 46: Launching Pad
| 
| align=center|1
| align=center|1:16
| Tempe, Arizona, United States
|

See also
List of male mixed martial artists
List of female mixed martial artists

References

External links

Ed West bio at Bellator MMA

1983 births
Sportspeople from Olongapo
Living people
American male mixed martial artists
Bantamweight mixed martial artists
Mixed martial artists utilizing Shotokan
Mixed martial artists utilizing taekwondo
Mixed martial artists utilizing wushu
Sportspeople from Tucson, Arizona
People from Pima County, Arizona
People from Olongapo
American wushu practitioners
American male taekwondo practitioners
American male karateka
Mixed martial artists from Arizona